= Assemblies (Jehova Shammah) =

Assemblies (Jehova Shammah) is a Christian denomination of India. It has more than 2,000 branches. It is present in Andhra Pradesh. Jehova Shammah was founded by Bhakta Singh in 1942.
